This is a timeline of first orbital launches by country. While a number of countries have built satellites, as of 2022, eleven countries have had the capability to send objects into orbit using their own launch vehicles. Russia and Ukraine inherited the space launchers and satellites capability from the Soviet Union, following its dissolution in 1991. Russia launches its rockets from its own and foreign (Kazakh) spaceports. 

Ukraine launched only from foreign (Kazakh and Russian) launch facilities until 2015, after which political differences with Russia effectively halted Ukraine's ability to produce orbital rockets.  France became a space power independently, launching a payload into orbit from Algeria, before joining space launcher facilities in the multi-national Ariane project. The United Kingdom became a space power independently following a single payload insertion into orbit from Australia.

Ten countries and one inter-governmental organisation (ESA) have a proven orbital launch capability, . Three countries (France, Italy and the United Kingdom) formerly had such an independent capability. In all cases where a country has conducted independent human spaceflights (as of 2021, three — China, the Soviet Union/Russia, and the United States), these launches were preceded by independent unmanned launch capability.

The race to launch the first satellite was closely contested by the Soviet Union and the United States, and was the beginning of the Space Race. The launching of satellites, while still contributing to national prestige, is a significant economic activity as well, with public and private rocket systems competing for launches, using cost and reliability as selling points.

List of first orbital launches by country

Countries like Italy are not included since they have not yet developed an orbital rocket from scratch; i.e., an orbital rocket that was designed and engineered in its entirety in the country in question.

Notes

Other launches and projects
The above list includes confirmed satellite launches with rockets produced by the launching country. Lists with differing criteria might include the following launches:

Failed launches
 has yet to launch a satellite into orbit independently and its space program suffered three satellite launch failures, the latest being the explosion of a VLS-1 rocket on 22 August 2003 at the Alcântara Launch Centre, which resulted in 21 deaths.

Launches of non-indigenous launch vehicles
Some countries have no self-developed rocket systems, but have provided their spaceports for launches of their own and foreign satellites on foreign launchers:
 with the first successful launch from Hammaguir of the French satellite Astérix on 26 November 1965 by French Diamant A. The last orbital launch from Hammaguir was on 15 February 1967 by French Diamant A and there are no further launches scheduled (the first Algerian satellite is AlSAT-1 launched by Russian Kosmos-3M from Plesetsk, Russia on 28 November 2002).
 with the first successful launch from the San Marco platform of its satellite San Marco 2 on 26 April 1967 by US Scout B (the first Italian satellite is San Marco 1 launched by another Scout from Wallops, USA on 15 December 1964). The last orbital launch from San Marco was on 25 March 1988 by US Scout G-1 and there are no further launches scheduled.
 with the first successful launch from Woomera Test Range of its first satellite WRESAT on 29 November 1967 by US Sparta. The second and final successful orbital launch from Woomera was performed on 28 October 1971 by the UK Black Arrow.
 with the first launch after its independence from the Baikonur Cosmodrome on 21 January 1992 of the Russian Soyuz-U2 and Progress M-11 (the first Kazakh satellite is KazSat launched by Russian Proton-K from Baikonur on 17 June 2006). Currently the spaceport continues to be utilized for launches of various Russian rockets.
; a single Pegasus-XL was launched from Orbital Sciences' Stargazer aircraft flying from Gran Canaria Airport in April 1997.
 with a successful launch of a Pegasus-H rocket from Orbital Sciences' Stargazer aircraft flying from Kwajalein Atoll in October 2000. Five ground-based launches were made by SpaceX using Falcon 1 rockets between 2006 and 2009, with the first success on 28 September 2008. Three further Pegasus launches occurred between 2008 and 2012, using the Pegasus-XL configuration. Currently there are no plans announced for a Marshall Islands satellite.

Privately developed launch vehicles
  Orbital Sciences Corporation (USA) became the first company to launch a privately developed rocket into orbit, the Pegasus on April 5, 1990. Orbital subsequently developed the Minotaur rocket family.  Orbital joined SpaceX as one of only two private entities to supply the International Space Station with its launch of the Cygnus Orb-D1 mission on its Antares rocket on September 28, 2013.
  SpaceX (USA) became the second company to launch a rocket into orbit using a rocket developed with private—not government—funds. Its first successful launch was performed on September 28, 2008, by Falcon 1 from the Omelek Island, Marshall Islands and its first launch from US spaceport was Falcon 9 Flight 1 on June 4, 2010, from Cape Canaveral. Its Dragon spacecraft docked with the International Space Station on October 11, 2012, to deliver supplies.
 American private company Rocket Lab successfully launched its Electron rocket from Mahia Launch Center in New Zealand on January 21, 2018, carrying three cubesats into low earth orbit. This was the first time that a rocket entered orbit after launching from a privately owned and operated spaceport.
 Chinese private company i-Space successfully launched its Hyperbola 1 rocket from Jiuquan Satellite Launch Center and sent several small payloads, including the CAS-7B amateur radio satellite into earth orbit on July 25, 2019.
 Galactic Energy successfully launched its Ceres-1 solid rocket from Jiuquan Satellite Launch Center into sun-synchronous orbit on November 7, 2020, becoming the second Chinese private company capable of launching satellites into orbit.
 Virgin Orbit successfully achieved orbit on January 17, 2021, using their LauncherOne vehicle to deploy 10 CubeSats into Low Earth Orbit for NASA.
 Astra Rocket 3.3 vehicle successfully reached orbit on November 20, 2021, after launching from Pacific Spaceport Complex – Alaska (PSCA) carrying the demonstration payload STP-27AD2 for the United States Space Force.

Abandoned projects
/ was developing larger designs in the Aggregat series as early as 1940. A combination of A9 to A12 components could have produced orbital capability as early as 1947 if work had continued. Further preliminary development of numerous rocket space launchers and re-usable launch systems (Sänger II, etc.) took place after WWII, although these were never realized as national or European projects. Also, in the late 1970s and early 1980s, the private German company OTRAG tried to develop low-cost commercial space launchers. Only sub-orbital tests of the first prototypes of these rockets were carried out.
 did not proceed with a 1946 proposal to develop German V-2 technology into the "Megaroc" system to be launched in 1949. The UK also developed the Black Arrow rocket system and successfully launched a satellite in 1971, shortly after the program had been cancelled.
 had developed the gun-based space launchers Martlet and GLO as the joint Canadian-American Project HARP in the 1960s. These rockets were never tested.
 developed the space launcher RSA-3 in the 1980s. This rocket was tested 3 times without a satellite payload in 1989 and 1990. The program was postponed and canceled in 1994.
 Iraq claimed to have developed and tested "Al-Abid", a three-stage space launch vehicle without a payload or its upper two stages on 5 December 1989. The rocket's design had a clustered first stage composed of five modified scud rockets strapped together and a single scud rocket as the second stage in addition to a SA-2 liquid-fueled rocket engine as the third stage. The video tape of a partial launch attempt which was retrieved by UN weapons inspectors, later surfaced showing that the rocket prematurely exploded 45 seconds after its launch.
 previous attempts at developing space launcher based on their Condor missile were scrapped in 1993.
 The VLS-1 was cancelled after decades of development and high expenditures with poor results and a failed association with Ukraine that slowed the program for years.
 tried to develop space launcher as part of its various ballistic missile programs in the second half of the 20th century. In different periods they worked independently or in cooperation with Argentina, Iraq and North Korea.
 developed the space launcher Capricornio (Capricorn) in the 1990s. This rocket was related to Argentina's Condor missile and its test scheduled for 1999/2000 was not conducted.
 Swiss Space Systems company planned to develop the micro satellite launcher-spaceplane SOAR by 2018 but went bankrupt.

Future projects
 is developing an orbital rocket called Tronador II, whose maiden flight is expected to take place in the next four years as of late 2020.
's ATSpace is developing an orbital launch vehicle called Kestrel, tentatively launching in 2022 from Whalers Way.
 
's Gilmour Space Technologies is developing an orbital launch vehicle called Eris, scheduled to launch in 2023.
 announced that it will launch its VLM rocket from the Alcântara Launch Center in 2025.
 is planning to launch military and security satellites. The first phase will begin in 2022.
 is planning to launch military and security satellites. The first phase will begin in 2024.
 Orbex is developing its Prime launch vehicle, whose first launch is planned in 2023 from Sutherland spaceport.
 Blue Origin is developing its New Glenn launch vehicle, whose first launch is planned for sometime in 2023.
 The private company PLD Space is developing the Miura 5 orbital launch vehicle, whose first launch is planned for 2024.
  OrbitX, a private company, plans to develop Haribon, a biofuel-powered launch vehicle.
  The private company Independence-X Aerospace is developing an orbital launch vehicle called DNLV, scheduled to launch in 2023.

Satellite operators
Many other countries have launched their own satellites on one of the foreign launchers listed above, the first being British owned and operated; American-built satellite Ariel 1, which was launched by a US rocket in April 1962. In September 1962 the Canadian satellite, Alouette-1, was launched by a US rocket, but unlike Ariel 1 it was constructed by Canada.

See also
List of orbital launch systems
List of missiles by country
Orbital spaceflight
Satellite
Spaceport (including timeline of first orbital launches by spaceport)
Discovery and exploration of the Solar System (including exploration by country)
Timeline of first artificial satellites by country
Timeline of Solar System exploration
Timeline of space exploration

References

External links
First Satellites Launched By Spacefaring Nations, Anthony R. Curtis, Ph.D., Space Today Online, accessed 17 February 2006.
National Briefings: Iraq, Ranger Associates, accessed 17 February 2006.
The 31 August 1998 North Korean Satellite Launch: Factsheet, Kevin Orfall and Gaurav Kampani, with Michael Dutra, Center for Nonproliferation Studies, Monterey Institute of International Studies, accessed 17 February 2006.
News Release 25-98, United States Space Command, 8 September 1998, accessed 17 February 2006.
Daily Press Briefing, James P. Rubin, United States Department of State, 14 September 1998, accessed 17 February 2006.
BBC World: Brazil Launches rocket into space
Space.com: Brazil completes successful rocket launch
Herald Tribune: Brazil launches rocket for gravity research
AFP: Iran rocket test 'unfortunate': White House
Space-Travel.com: Iran opens its first space centre, riling the US
New York Times: Iran Launches Rocket to Commemorate New Space Center
MSNBC: Iran unveils space center, launches rocket